Jay Joseph Graydon (born October 8, 1949, Burbank, California) is an American songwriter, recording artist, guitarist, singer, keyboardist, producer, arranger, and recording engineer. He is the winner of two Grammy Awards (in the R&B category) with twelve Grammy nominations, among them the title "Producer of the Year" and "Best Engineered Recording". He has mastered many different music styles and genres, and his recordings have been featured on record, film, television and the stage.

History
Graydon made his singing debut on his second birthday on the "Joe Graydon Show," the first music/talk television show in Los Angeles, hosted by his father, Joe Graydon.

During and for a brief time after his college days, Graydon played in the Don Ellis Band, whose style can be described as experimental post-bop jazz. He can be heard on the live double album Don Ellis at Fillmore and the studio albums The New Don Ellis Band Goes Underground, Connection and Soaring.

L. A. session musician
From the late 1960s to late 1970s Graydon was a session musician in Los Angeles, working with such artists as Gino Vannelli, Barbra Streisand, Dolly Parton, Diana Ross, The Jackson Five, Alice Cooper, Cheap Trick, Al Jarreau, Christopher Cross, Ray Charles, Cher, Joe Cocker, Marvin Gaye, Hall & Oates, Wayne Shorter, Olivia Newton-John, Albert King. One of Graydon's most notable session performances is his guitar solo on Steely Dan's 1977 hit single "Peg".

In 1977 he appeared as a character in a number of Doonesbury strips as Jay "Wah-Wah" Graydon. Graydon played on the Jimmy Thudpucker album "Greatest Hits" along with Steve Cropper and Donald "Duck" Dunn. He was the subject of the track "Fretman Sam" and played its guitar solo. He also programmed the synthesizers for the album.

Producer
Jay Graydon's production credits include work with Airplay, Air Supply, George Benson, Al Jarreau, DeBarge, El DeBarge, Sheena Easton, Art Garfunkel, The Manhattan Transfer, Johnny Mathis, Patti LaBelle, Lou Rawls, Dionne Warwick, Alan Sorrenti and the album They Don't Make Them Like They Used To by Kenny Rogers.

He started his own record label, Sonic Thrust Records, in 2001 to give himself creative and artistic freedom in his songwriting and producing profession. The label features straight-ahead jazz, adult contemporary pop, AAA, AOR, classic R&B, smooth jazz, and genuine retro surf from the 1960s

As a musician and recording engineer, he has often been a consultant and beta tester for new musical equipment and recording gear.

Songwriter
Graydon has written over 200 songs. His catalog includes the Grammy winners "Turn Your Love Around" (co-written with Steve Lukather and Bill Champlin) as performed by George Benson and "After the Love Has Gone" (co-written with David Foster and Bill Champlin) as performed by Earth, Wind & Fire, as well as "Who's Holding Donna Now" (DeBarge), "Friends in Love" (Dionne Warwick and Johnny Mathis), many songs written with and for Al Jarreau (including "Mornin'", "Breakin' Away", "High Crime", "After All", and "Roof Garden"), and several hits with Manhattan Transfer including "Twilight Zone", "On The Boulevard", "Smile Again" and "Spies in the Night". Many of his songs were co-written with David Foster.

Writer and educator
Graydon has written numerous articles in music magazines, and has conducted seminars at Musician's Institute in Hollywood with guitarist Tommy Tedesco for over 15 years. He has been working on a series of books on recording techniques with Craig Anderton, a widely published and bestselling authority on recording technology. The books will discuss the subtleties of recording various instruments, as well as mixing.

Film scores
Graydon has participated as a musician and/or songwriter in over 50 film scores including The French Connection, Grease, Ghostbusters, St. Elmo's Fire, The Secret of My Success, Navy Seals, Lady Sings the Blues, The Greatest, Ghost Dad, Mahogany, and Thank God It's Friday.

Television
Graydon has played on or written songs for The Andy Williams Show, The Jackson 5 Show, The Alan Thicke Show, The David Steinberg Show, The Ed Sullivan Show, The Tonight Show, The Merv Griffin Show, The Soupy Sales Show, The Smothers Brothers Show, The Midnight Special, The First Rock and Roll Awards Show, Miami Vice, and Starsky and Hutch.

With Richard Page, he also wrote the second theme song for Gimme a Break!, which was used from its third through sixth seasons.

Key collaborations

Al Jarreau 
Perhaps Graydon's most noted collaboration has been with Al Jarreau. Graydon was Jarreau's main songwriter/producer for in the early 1980s. Graydon produced Jarreau's albums This Time, Breakin' Away, Jarreau and  High Crime, among others. Graydon also played guitar and synthesizer on these albums, as well as serving as songwriter, arranger and engineer.

David Foster 
Foster and Graydon have worked together on several album projects, including the band Airplay, a pop-rock group they formed in the late 1970s, and the JT Super Producer concert in Japan in 1994 with René Angélil and Céline Dion.

Randy Goodrum 
Graydon and Randy Goodrum formed a group named JaR.  In 2008, they released an album titled Scene 29, described as "Steely Dan meets Airplay and Pages".

Steely Dan 
Graydon played the guitar solo on the song "Peg" on Steely Dan's 1977 album Aja.

David "Fathead" Newman 
 He played on Concrete Jungle.

Discography

Solo albums

Collaborations

Grammy Awards

References

External links
 Artist's website
 Artist's 2nd website
 Artist's YouTube channel
 Artist's Myspace website
 Graydon, Jay writing credits
 Jay Graydon's Collaboration with Randy Goodrum as the group JaR
 Jay Graydon – Artist – grammy.com
 Jay Graydon's awards and nominations

1949 births
Living people
Record producers from California
Songwriters from California
Grammy Award winners
Smooth jazz guitarists
American session musicians